Bruce Clark is the International Security Editor of The Economist, and the author of Twice A Stranger: How Mass Expulsion Forged Modern Greece and Turkey.

The son of Wallace Clark, a Northern Irish author and businessman, he was educated at Shrewsbury and St John's College, Cambridge. His writing for The Economist usually focuses on religion or defence.

Clark wrote for Reuters and was The Times correspondent in Moscow 1991-1993. His book Twice A Stranger is a history of the population exchange between Greece and Turkey which took place in the early 1920s following the Treaty of Lausanne. The book won the Runciman Award in 2007.

References

British male journalists
Male non-fiction writers from Northern Ireland
The Economist people
Journalists from Northern Ireland
Living people
Alumni of St John's College, Cambridge
Columnists from Northern Ireland
Year of birth missing (living people)